Vampire Cleanup Department (救僵清道夫) is a 2017 Hong Kong comedy horror film directed by Yan Pak-wing and Chiu Sin-hang.

The film is a memorial for Lam Ching-ying's passing away 20 years ago.

Plot

Prologue
In the year 1840 in Oxtail Village-Hong Kong, a 20-year-old girl named Yik Siu-ha (aka Summer) was buried alive as an offering to her dead landlord into the afterlife. Both her and the landlord's bodies were placed in a casket and buried. Yik Siu-ha would spend her final mortal moments scratching her casket to escape. Unfortunately, both died from deep negative emotions and caused both to become jiangshi.

Since ancient times, there have existed the jiangshi (a type of zombie that returns from the dead and feeds on the life force of living beings). Modernly, they are viewed as hopping vampires that prey on the blood of its victims. Although the government knew the existence of the jiangshi, they have buried all public knowledge about them and society viewed the threat as a myth. Originally, they dispatched Maoshan Taoist priests to handle the problem. Eventually though, the British Hong Kong government covertly created the Vampire Cleanup Department (aka VCD) to discreetly exorcise the jiangshi. Disguised as the city's sanitation, the VCD are the first line defense against vampire threats.

About 20 years ago, Yat Lung Cheung and his wife (both part of VCD) fought against the jiangshi and lost. Both of them were bitten and infected, but Yat Lung's wife at the time was pregnant. Cheung was turning and he volunteered to cremate himself before he turns. Before his wife's death, his team members helped him deliver a baby boy. The boy would grown up to be Tim Cheung.

Main Story
Tim Cheung (Babyjohn Choi) is just an ordinary student in Hong Kong and looks after his paternal grandmother (who suffers from memory issues). Growing up, his classmates calls him 'rubbish bin' because his deceased parents worked in sanitation and his grandmother recycles cardboard for a living. One fateful night, Tim was involved in a vampire cleanup op. An old man was killed by a vampire and Tim was bitten before VCD Agent Chau (Siu-Ho Chin) arrived to neutralize the vampire. Upon waking up, Tim woke to find himself back at his grandma's apartment with VCD Agent Yeung Chung (Richard Ng) and Chau. Chung offered to explain everything the following day, leaving Tim curious and confused.

The following day, Tim made it to the sanitation building. Through a hidden door, Tim entered to meet Chung and was given a quick summary about HK's sanctioned anti-vampire operation. Chung wanted to recruit Tim into the VCD because of their aging members. However, everyone else was either against or reluctant to accept Tim due to their history with Yat Lung. Tim didn't believe in vampires and just wanted to leave. However, he quickly became a believer when he tripped over a detained vampire. Chung would reveal that Tim's parents were part of VCD and Yat Lung (Tim's father) was their leader. Chung explained his mother was bitten during her pregnancy and helped him develop an immunity towards vampire toxins, making him a great candidate to succeed their agency. Chung offered Tim a cup of "Calming Tea" (memory erasure tea) and ask him to think about things over. If Tim doesn't want to join, he can drink the tea and forget everything that ever happened or train to become a VCD agent. Tim chose to join the VCD.

Tim soon started his anti-vampire training. Each of the agents taught Tim an area of expertise. Priest Ginger (Cheung-Yan Yuen) taught him anti-vampire amulet spells, Chau taught him martial arts, and Kui (Meng Lo) taught him how to use their anti-vampire weapons. While not ready to take on a vampire, Chau decided to take Tim to Sai Kung on his first training mission. A treasure hunter had dived into the lake (that was once Oxtail Village) and found two caskets. He opened one and died from wrath of the undead landlord (aka Vampire King).

At the lake, Chung and Chau encountered the Vampire King and fought him. The fight was short as Tim encountered his own vampire and cried for help. Tim encountered Summer (Lin Min-chen). He fell into the lake where Summer bit Tim in the lip. As Summer drank Tim's unique blood, it transformed her rotten body into her former youthful form. Chau arrested Summer and took the body back to VCD HQ. Along the way, the VCD crew encountered Inspector Chu. Chu is part of the HK police division that co-manage the vampire situation with the VCD. However, he doesn't like the VCD and have his own research team look into new ways in dealing with the vampire situation. Chu is interested in developing an anti-vampire vaccine that would cure vampirism and end the VCD's jurisdiction. Chu's break would come when they discovered Summer's vampire tooth.

At VCD HQ, the crew learned about Oxtail Village and Summer's unfortunate life. They realized that Summer is the Vampire King's bride and if they were to ever bond together, it could lead to disaster. Tim was instructed to burn Summer's body but the amulet holding her came off and she followed Tim. Unable to get her back to the cremation table, Tim went home with Summer following him. He tried to seal her off in his closet, but he realized Summer is claustrophobic due to being buried alive and sealed in a casket for over a century. Summer calmed down when she was exposed to watching Chinese Opera on TV and Tim took the time to study more about vampires. It was through one of the manuals that Tim learned the landlord is a Dry Vampire (a powerful and malevolent type) and Summer a Human Vampire (a vampire with human traits). Viewing Summer as harmless, Tim decided to keep her around to learn more about vampires.

In between training, Tim learned that Summer loves Pig Blood Curd and enjoys Chinese Opera. As time went on, Summer continues to develop more human traits and the two began to show feelings for each other. Due to the dangerous nature of the job, Chau told Tim to fulfill any wish to his grandma to make her die feeling happy. Tim decided to bring Summer to his grandma's place to pretend they are a couple. Grandma Cheung was very happy to know Tim has a girlfriend. Because Summer can't be seen hopping around, Tim gave her a hover board to cover her vampire traits. While observing a couple walking and holding hands, Summer expressed the desire to walk for Tim and the two got even closer. Things would end when the Vampire King returned.

Chau merely injured the Vampire King with amulet stakes. The vampire fed on the blood of rats to regain enough power to attack civilians. During that time, Tim was being tested for his ability to defeat a live vampire to prove he's ready to be a full-fledged VCD agent. However, after holding down the vampire, Tim wanted to show everyone that vampires don't necessarily need to be slayed. Distracted, Tim lost the upper-hand and the vampire was choking him to death. Chau wanted Tim to slay the vampire, but Tim couldn't. Summer's enhanced hearing detected Tim was in danger and charged into their sanctum to save Tim. Chau was angered to know he kept Summer and even defended her. Their argument was put on hold when they got the call about the Vampire King. Summer was neutralized and Tim begged Priest Ginger to not kill her and he agreed. Tim tried to reason with Chau about Summer, but he was too enraged and destroyed Tim's sword, saying he was unworthy to wield it. Things would take a turn for the worst when Inspector Chu returned to take over VCD.

While Chau and Kui looked for the Vampire King, Chu arrived with official papers to replace the VCD with his own squad and armed with the experimental anti-vampire vaccine. As Chu's men take away Summer, Priest Ginger tried to warn them that the Vampire King will look for Summer if she's brought into the open; Chu was counting on it. In an emptied mall, Chu tied down Summer to lure the Vampire King. The VCD team accepted their dismissal and decided to take action on their own.

At the mall, the VCD team reunited to face off the Vampire King. The landlord arrived for Summer and Chu thought he would disintegrate the Vampire King with his new weapon, but it didn't work. While it was effective against a lesser vampire, it had no effect against a dry type. Chau, Kui, Ginger, and Tim had to step in to take on the Vampire King by mortal combat. Despite their best efforts, the vampire proved to be powerful and Chau was bitten. The VCD team managed to hold the Vampire King with rope and drag his body up against the sunlight to burn him away. However, Tim was also stuck with the vampire as well. Summer broke free of her bindings and saved Tim from harm and helped burn the Vampire King to death. Sadly, Summer's actions cost her life. The sunlight was burning Summer away. Despite Tim encouraging Summer to drink his blood to save herself, she refused to. In their final moments, Summer smiled as she disintegrated and Tim tearfully kissed her, confessing his love for her.

In the aftermath, the VCD proved their effectiveness and not only reinstated, but was given a larger facility and even recruited a new team of VCD trainees. Chau survived his bite and was cured after doctors developed a vaccine from Tim's immunity. It was while talking to the new trainees that Tim happily encountered Winter, a trainee that looks just like Summer. The story ends with Tim preparing for a new mission.

Cast
 Babyjohn Choi as Tim Cheung, an intern vampire sweeper whose blood is resistant to the infection from vampires. His parents were both in the department, but were unfortunately bitten by a vampire during a mission. Tim's mother was giving birth to Tim, which resulted in him being neither human nor vampire. Tim then falls in love with a female vampire called Summer (Yik Siu-ha).
 Lin Min-Chen as Summer/Winter, originally named Yik Siu-ha, born in 1820, died in 1840. She was buried as funeral objects to the landlord. She woke up as a female vampire with the landlord vampire. Winter is a trainee vampire sweeper who looks exactly like Summer and is implied to be her reincarnation.
 Chin Siu-ho as Yip Chi Chau, Tim's master, teaching him how to fight against vampires. The fighter of the department.
 Richard Ng as "Uncle" Yeung Chung, director of the department, in charging technical support.
 Lo Mang as Tai Gau Kui, in charge of producing weapons and supplies or cleaning up.
 Bondy Chiu as M
 Yuen Cheung-yan as Master Ginger
 Siu Yam-yam as Tim's Grandma
 Lee Sheung-ching as Inspector Chu
 Tat Chi Yu as Security Guard
 Jim Chim Sui-man as Congee Restaurant Owner
 Eric Tsang as Policeman

Reception
The Hollywood Reporter stated that the film was "enjoyable in a throwaway kind of way, and it’s forgotten as soon as the credits roll" and that the film finding that it "shamelessly trades in nostalgia for both the singularly Chinese creature and the goofy horror comedies Hong Kong pumped out in the 1980s and early ’90s."
Edmund Lee of the South China Morning Post compared the film to Juno Mak's Rigor Mortis and the Wong Jing production Sifu vs Vampire that "we finally have an adequate homage to the comedic tradition immortalised by Mr Vampire (1985) and its sequels." The review gave the film a three out of five rating, concluding it as a "frothy yet genuinely likeable film"

Awards and nominations

References

External links

2017 horror films
2017 comedy horror films
Films set in Hong Kong
Films shot in Hong Kong
2017 directorial debut films
Vampire comedy films
Hong Kong supernatural horror films
Hong Kong comedy horror films
2010s Cantonese-language films
2010s Hong Kong films